The Sailors of Kronstadt is a 1936 Soviet drama war film directed by Efim Dzigan.

Plot 
The film tells about the confrontation of the sailors of the Baltic Fleet and the Yudenich formations, which besiege Petrograd.

Cast 
 Vasiliy Zaychikov as Commissar Vasili Martinov (as Vasili Zajchikov)
 Georgi Bushuyev as Artyom Balashov
 Nikolay Ivakin as A Red Army Soldier
 Oleg Zhakov as Regiment Commander Draudin
 Raisa Yesipova as Mademoiselle
 Pyotr Kirillov as Seaman Valentin Bezprozvanny
 E. Gunn as Seaman Anton Karabash
 Mikhail Gurinenko as Misha, the cabin boy (as Misha Gurinenko)
 Fyodor Seleznyov as A White Army Soldier (as F. Seleznyov)
 Pyotr Sobolevsky as A Lieutenant

Reception
Writing for The Spectator in 1937, Graham Greene gave the film a good review, characterizing it as being "in the tradition of boys' stories, full of last charges and fights to the death, heroic sacrifices and narrow escapes, all superbly directed", and summarizing it as an "unusual mixture of poetry and heroics". Identifying moments of humour and pathos, Greene claimed that a Fordian poetic sense (i.e. not melodic arrangement, but moral composition) had thoroughly "impregnated" the film "from the first shot to the last", and that the writing resonated with Chekhov's definition of the novelist's purpose, "life as it is: life as it ought to be". Greene would return several months later to re-review the film for Night and Day where he again claimed that it was "the best film to be seen in London". Describing the film as somewhat propagandistic, Greene noted that "what makes the film immeasurably superior to its rivals is the strain of adult poetry, the sense of human beings longing for peace".

References

External links 

1936 films
1930s Russian-language films
Soviet black-and-white films
Soviet war drama films
1930s war drama films
1936 drama films